RTI(-4229)-353 is a phenyltropane derived drug which acts as an SSRI. Tamagnan et al. also made some phenyltropanes with high activity and selectivity for the SERT (pM affinity).

See also 
RTI-83
Troparil
Tropine
Tropinone

References

Iodoarenes
Tropanes
RTI compounds
Selective serotonin reuptake inhibitors